Jon V. Ferrara (born January 22, 1960) is an American entrepreneur and the founder of Nimble LLC, his most recent venture. Ferrara is best known as the co-founder of GoldMine Software Corp, one of the early pioneers in the Sales Force Automation (SFA) and Customer Relationship Management (CRM) software categories for Small to Medium-sized Businesses (SMBs).

Influence and honors 

Ferrara has been recognized for pioneering innovation with honors such as the 1997 Ernst & Young Entrepreneur of the Year.
His company GoldMine Software, ranked #154 on the 1997 Inc. 500, a national "Fast 500" company, swept the computer industry awards. Highlights include being awarded back-to-back-to-back-to-back PC Magazine's "Editor's Choice" (August 1993, August 1995, April 1996 and August 1997). He is a graduate of California State University, Northridge.

Career 

Prior to founding GoldMine Software, Ferrara was one of the early employees at Banyan Vines.

References 

1960 births
Living people